Muhlenberg Regional Medical Center was a community-based acute care hospital in Plainfield, New Jersey.

History
It was founded in 1877 by the residents of Plainfield after a railroad accident. Job Male, the first mayor of Plainfield, donated the land.

The hospital was first located on Muhlenberg Place, now West Third Street.

The hospital is named after Reverend William Augustus Muhlenberg, who was a rector at the Protestant Episcopal Church of the Holy Communion in New York. William Muhlenberg was also the founder of St. Luke's Hospital in New York City.

Muhlenberg School of Nursing was founded in 1894 with two students. In 1971 the School of Nursing established an affiliation with Union County College in Cranford.

In 1994 the hospital celebrated its 100th anniversary.

In 1997 Solaris Health System was formed by joining Muhlenberg Regional Medical Center and JFK Medical Center in Edison. In November, 2007, Solaris Health System announced that it was intending to sell Muhlenberg.

Muhlenberg Regional Medical Center closed its 355-bed facility on August 13, 2008. JFK Medical Center continues to operate a satellite emergency department as well as other outpatient care from the facility.

Verifications for Muhlenberg Regional Medical Center have become available through the Federation Credentials Verification Service (FCVS) Closed Residency program records.

Deaths
Edward K. Gill (1917–1985), heart ailment

References

External links
 Muhlenberg Harold B. and Dorothy A. Snyder Schools of Nursing, History, Retrieved 6/4/2009 
 Plainfield Today: Muhlenberg Hospital Sale: A Blessing in Disguise? Friday, November 16, 2007
  New Jersey Monthly; Who Killed Muhlenberg Hospital?, October 14, 2008.  
 JFK Medical Center, Muhlenberg Campus

Defunct hospitals in New Jersey
Plainfield, New Jersey
Buildings and structures in Middlesex County, New Jersey
Hospitals established in 1877
1877 establishments in New Jersey